Ende Regency is a regency on the island of Flores, within East Nusa Tenggara Province of Indonesia. The capital is the town of Ende. The regency covers an area of 1,946.29 km2, and it had a population of 260,605 at the 2010 Census and 270,763 at the 2020 Census; the official estimate as at mid 2021 was 272,078.

The Kelimutu National Park which contains the well-known tourist attraction of Mount Kelimutu with three coloured lakes is in Ende Regency.

Administration 
The regency is divided into twenty-one districts (kecamatan), tabulated below with their areas and their populations at the 2010 Census and the 2020 Census, together with the official estimates as at mid 2021. The table also includes the locations of the district administrative centres, the number of villages (rural desa and urban kelurahan) in each district, and its post code.

the 
Note: (a) a new district created since 2010 by splitting of existing neighbouring districts. (b) the 2010 Census population of the new Lepembuso Kelisoke District is included with the figure for the districts from which it was split.

References

External links 
 

Regencies of East Nusa Tenggara
Flores Island (Indonesia)